The Dalian International Trade Center is a supertall skyscraper designed by architecture firm HOK in Dalian, Liaoning,[China.

Construction began in July 21st 2003, site on opposite side of road in restarted construction on April 06th 2012 and was topped-out in 2017. The building was completed in 2019.

References

External links
  (general database of skyscrapers)
  (diagrams of skyscrapers)

Skyscrapers in Dalian
Buildings and structures under construction in China
Skyscraper office buildings in China
Skyscraper hotels in China